The fifth wave of Walt Disney Treasures was released on December 6, 2005. Starting with this wave the DVD cases are now single opening, but the same size as the previous.

The Chronological Donald, Volume Two

This set covers the second leg of Donald Duck's long career, starting from 1942 to 1946, covering World War II in the process. Most international releases of this set do not include the bonus feature "From the Vault". Six of the eight cartoons are instead included in the main list of shorts, while the shorts Commando Duck and Der Fuehrer's Face are absent. The omission of these shorts have not been explained. Also omitted from the international release is the short Donald's Crime,  but this omission was probably due to mistake, as all versions of The Great Mouse Detective DVD include it. The Chronological Donald, Volume Two did not receive the beautiful restoration of Volume One. Prints are worn and the image quality is visibly worse than all earlier Disney Treasures Volumes.

125,000 sets produced.

Disc one
1942
Bellboy Donald
The Village Smithy
Donald's Snow Fight
Donald's Garden
Donald's Gold Mine
1943
Donald's Tire Trouble
The Flying Jalopy
From the Vault (Not entirely included on international releases)
1942
Donald Gets Drafted
The Vanishing Private
Sky Trooper
1943
Der Fuehrer's Face
Fall Out - Fall In
The Old Army Game
Home Defense
1944
Commando Duck
Bonus Features
A Day in the Life of Donald Duck: This is a 1956 episode of the Disney anthology series. As the name of the episode implies, viewers experience Donald himself as he struggles through a typical day at the Walt Disney Studios. In the process, he meets up with Jimmie Dodd, Roy Williams, the Mouseketeers and even his own voice and alter ego, Clarence Nash himself.

 Sky Trooper is included on the disc twice; the second is resolution-compromised.

Disc two
1944
Trombone Trouble
The Plastics Inventor
Donald's Off Day
Donald Duck and the Gorilla
Contrary Condor
1945
The Eyes Have It
Donald's Crime
Duck Pimples
No Sail
Cured Duck
The Clock Watcher
Old Sequoia
1946
Donald's Double Trouble
Wet Paint
Dumb Bell of the Yukon
Lighthouse Keeping
Frank Duck Brings 'Em Back Alive
Bonus Features
Drawing and Talking 'Duck' with Tony Anselmo: Maltin meets with Tony Anselmo, who is the present voice of Donald and has been so since the mid-1980s. He reveals how he emerged as the man behind the duck and his respect and loyalty to the Disney name.
The Art and Animation of Carl Barks: Carl Barks, although he started out as a storyman for some of Donald's earliest shorts, is best known for the Donald Duck comics. Various relevant individuals give their thought on the man and his work and emphasize his influence on DuckTales (a clip from the episode "The Time Teasers" can be seen during the special) and such blockbusters as Raiders of the Lost Ark.
The Volunteer Worker: An additional short dating from 1940. In this cartoon, Donald goes from door to door trying to collect money for charity, but to no avail when every door he visits slams in his face. His frustrations lead him to the personal testimony of a man he meets on the street who had once benefited from charities himself. Unlike the first Donald set, which featured the cartoon as an Easter egg, this cartoon is displayed in full view on this set.
Timeline: The War Years, 1941–1945: This segment shows off a variety of things that had come out of Disney during these years, using clips and captions in the style of a newsreel.
Galleries: These galleries cover assortments of concept art, storyboard sketches and background paintings from the various Donald shorts on this set.

Disney Rarities: Celebrated Shorts: 1920s–1960s

This set covers many miscellaneous cartoons to come out of the studio that do not feature the usual stable of Disney stars and do not even fit in Silly Symphonies or did not feature the Silly Symphonies title card. This set also includes a few select episodes from the Alice Comedies, which were made in the 1920s in the years leading up to Mickey Mouse's debut.

125,000 sets produced.

Disc one
Alice Comedies
Alice's Wonderland (1923)
Alice's Wild West Show (1924)
Alice Gets in Dutch (1924)
Alice's Egg Plant (1925)
Alice in the Jungle (1925)
Alice's Mysterious Mystery (1926)
Alice the Whaler (1927)
One Shots
Ferdinand the Bull (1938)
Chicken Little (1943)
The Pelican and the Snipe (1944)
The Brave Engineer (1950)
Morris the Midget Moose (1950)
Lambert the Sheepish Lion (1952)
The Little House (1952)
Adventures in Music: Melody (1953)
Football Now and Then (1953)
Adventures in Music: Toot, Whistle, Plunk and Boom (1953)
Ben and Me (1953)
Bonus Features
Alice's Cartoon World: An Interview with Virginia Davis: Leonard Maltin interviews Virginia Davis, who portrayed the little girl, Alice, in Walt's silent comedies of the 1920s
From Kansas City to Hollywood: A Timeline of Disney's Silent Era: A featurette about Walt Disney's journey into the entertainment industry, from an ad company in Kansas City up to the discovery of synchronized sound.

Disc two
The Shorts
Pigs Is Pigs (1954)
Social Lion (1954)
Hooked Bear (1956)
Jack and Old Mac (1956)
In the Bag (1956)
A Cowboy Needs a Horse (1956)
The Story of Anyburg U.S.A. (1957)
The Truth About Mother Goose (1957)
Paul Bunyan (1958)
Noah's Ark* (1959)
Goliath II (1960)
The Saga of Windwagon Smith (1961)
A Symposium on Popular Songs** (1962)
Bonus Features
Audio Commentary: Heard over A Symposium On Popular Songs, Leonard Maltin interviews Richard M. Sherman who with his brother Robert wrote the songs for the short as well as several Disney films and theme park attractions from the 1960s–2000s.
A Feather in His Collar (1946): Pluto demonstrates donating to his local community chest.
Galleries: These galleries include assortments of concept art, storyboard sketches and background paintings from a handful of the cartoons presented this DVD set.

(*): Stopmotion 

(**): Combination of Stop-motion and traditional animation

The Adventures of Spin & Marty (The Mickey Mouse Club)

This set contains the entire Adventures of Spin and Marty serial, which was first broadcast on the Mickey Mouse Club in 1955.

125,000 sets produced.

Disc one

The Triple-R (November 7, 1955)
The Misfit (November 8, 1955)
The White Stallion (November 9, 1955)
Froggy Day (November 10, 1955)
The Battle (November 11, 1955)
A Surprise Decision (November 14, 1955)
Homesick (November 15, 1955)
Logan's Lesson (November 16, 1955)
The Chase (November 17, 1955)
Ride-'Em-Cowboy (November 18, 1955)
 Bonus Features - The Mickey Mouse Club episode 25; November 4, 1955: An Introduction to the Adventures of Spin & Marty

Disc two

The Snipe Hunt (November 21, 1955)
The Secret Ride (November 22, 1955)
Tragedy (November 23, 1955)
Perkin's Decision (November 24, 1955)
Tossing the Calf (November 25, 1955)
Rope Artist (November 28, 1955)
Nothing Happens on a Sunday (November 29, 1955)
Perkins and the Bear (November 30, 1955)
The Runaway (December 1, 1955)
Haunted Valley (December 2, 1955)
The Live Ghost (December 5, 1955)
The Big Rodeo (December 6, 1955)
Off on the Wrong Foot (December 7, 1955)
Sky Rocket's Trick (December 8, 1955)
The Last Campfire (December 9, 1955)
Bonus Features
Return to the Triple-R
Back in the Saddle with Harry Carey, Jr.

Elfego Baca and the Swamp Fox: Legendary Heroes

This set contains selected episodes from the two adventure series from Walt Disney anthology series.

125,000 sets produced.

Disc one
The Nine Lives of Elfego Baca (Episode 1 of 10-part series) October 3, 1958
Four Down and Five Lives to Go (Episode 2) October 17, 1958
Attorney at Law (Episode 5) February 6, 1959
Bonus Features
The Many Lives of Robert Loggia
Galleries

Disc two
The Birth of the Swamp Fox (Episode 1 of 8-part series) October 23, 1959
Brother Against Brother (Episode 2) October 30, 1959
Tory Vengeance (Episode 3) January 1, 1960
Bonus Feature
Walt Disney Presents Heroes of the American Frontier

External links 
 

5